Sri Lanka is a tropical island situated close to the southern tip of India. The invertebrate fauna is as large as it is common to other regions of the world. There are about 2 million species of arthropods found in the world, and still it is counting. So many new species are discover up to this time also. So it is very complicated and difficult to summarize the exact number of species found within a certain region. 
The following list provide the bees of Sri Lanka.

Bees
Phylum: Arthropoda   Class: Insecta
Order: Hymenoptera. 
Suborder: Apocrita.

Bees are the primary pollinators of terrestrial flowering plants. The hairs within its body helps to function as efficient pollinators. The highest bee diversity is confined to warm temperate regions of the world. There are about 70,000 bee species described in the world with nearly 450 genera and 7 families. Out of them, Sri Lanka comprises 149 species included to 38 genera and 4 families. The bee researches are extensively carried out by Dr. Inoka Karunaratne et al. from University of Peradeniya.

Family: Apidae Common bees
 
 Amegilla confusa
 Amegilla quadrifasciata
 Amegilla violacea
 Amegilla mucorea
 Amegilla fallax
 Amegilla subcoerulea
 Amegilla cingulata
 Amegilla cingulifera
 Amegilla comberi
 Amegilla niveocincta
 Amegilla perasserta
 Amegilla puttalama
 Amegilla subinsularis
 Amegilla zonata
 Apis cerana
 Apis dorsata
 Apis florea
 Apis mellifera
 Braunsapis cupulifera
 Braunsapis flaviventris
 Braunsapis mixta
 Braunsapis picitarsis
 Ceratina hieroglyphica
 Ceratina binghami
 Ceratina smaragdula
 Ceratina tanganyicensis
 Ceratina beata
 Ceratina picta
 Nomada adusta
 Nomada antennata
 Nomada bicellularis
 Nomada ceylonica
 Nomada lusca
 Nomada priscilla
 Nomada wickwari
 Tetragonula iridipennis
 Tetragonula praeterita
 Tetralonia commixtana
 Tetralonia fumida
 Tetraloniella taprobanicola
 Thyreus ceylonicus
 Thyreus histrio
 Thyreus insignis
 Thyreus ramosellus
 Thyreus surniculus
 Thyreus takaonis
 Xylocopa aestuans
 Xylocopa amethystina
 Xylocopa auripennis
 Xylocopa bryorum
 Xylocopa caerulea
 Xylocopa dejeanii
 Xylocopa fenestrata
 Xylocopa nasalis
 Xylocopa nigrocaerulea
 Xylocopa ruficornis
 Xylocopa tenuiscapa
 Xylocopa tranquibarica

Family Colletidae - Polyester bees
 Hylaeus krombeini
 Hylaeus sedens

Family: Halictidae - Sweat bees
 
 Ceylalictus appendiculata
 Ceylalictus horni
 Ceylalictus cereus
 Ceylalictus taprobanae
 Curvinomia formosa
 Curvinomia iridiscens
 Halictus lucudipennis
 Homalictus singhalensis
 Homalictus paradnanus
 Hoplonomia westwoodi
 Lasioglossum amblypygus
 Lasioglossum cire
 Lasioglossum clarum
 Lasioglossum semisculptum
 Lasioglossum vagans
 Lasioglossum carinifrons
 Lasioglossum halictoides
 Lasioglossum serenum
 Lasioglossum alphenum
 Lasioglossum aulacophorum
 Lasioglossum bidentatum
 Lasioglossum kandiense
 Lipotriches basipicta
 Lipotriches bombayensis
 Lipotriches edirisinghei
 Lipotriches exagens
 Lipotriches fervida
 Lipotriches fulvinerva
 Lipotriches karnatakaensis
 Lipotriches krombeini
 Lipotriches notiomorpha
 Lipotriches pulchriventris
 Lipotriches rustica
 Lipotriches torrida
 Nomia aurata
 Nomia crassipes
 Pachyhalictus bedanus
 Pachyhalictus karunaratnei
 Patellapis kalutarae
 Patellapis sigiriella
 Patellapis vincta
 Pseudapis oxybeloides
 Sphecodes biroi
 Sphecodes crassicornis
 Sphecodes decorus
 Steganomus nodicornis
 Systropha tropicalis

Family: Megachilidae - Leafcutter bees
 
 Anthidiellum butarsis
 Anthidiellum krombeini
 Anthidiellum ramakrishnae
 Coelioxys angulata
 Coelioxys apicata
 Coelioxys capitata
 Coelioxys confusa
 Coelioxys fenestrata
 Coelioxys fuscipennis
 Coelioxys minuta
 Coelioxys nitidoscutellaris
 Coelioxys formosicola
 Euaspis edentata
 Heriades parvula
 Lithurgus atratus
 Megachile albolineata
 Megachile amputata
 Megachile ardens
 Megachile ceylonica
 Megachile conjuncta
 Megachile disjuncta
 Megachile hera
 Megachile kandyca
 Megachile lanata
 Megachile mystacea
 Megachile nana
 Megachile nigricans
 Megachile reepeni
 Megachile relata
 Megachile umbripennis
 Megachile vestita
 Megachile vigilans
 Pachyanthidium lachrymosum 
 Pseudoanthidium orientale
 Pseudoanthidium rotundiventre

Undescribed 
 Austronomia sp. 1 determined by Pauly 2003
 Austronomia sp. 2 determined by Pauly 2003
 Gnathonomia sp. 2 
 Leuconomia sp. determined by Pauly 2003
 Maynenomia sp. 1
 Maynenomia sp. 2
 Pachynomia sp.
 Amegilla sp.[manuscript name scintillans of Lieftinck, 1977] 
 Trigona sp.

References
 https://web.archive.org/web/20150210070256/http://www.sljol.info/index.php/JNSFSL/article/view/134
 http://slendemics.net/easl/invertibrates/bees/bees.html
 The Fauna of Sri Lanka:Status of Taxonomy, Research and Conservation by Channa. N. B. Bambaradeniya
 http://www.atlashymenoptera.net/biblio/Karunaratne_et_al_2006_Sri_Lanka.pdf

Notes

 
.Sri Lanka
Bees
Sri Lanka
Sri Lanka